Rustic Rehab is a reality television series airing on HGTV hosted by real estate agents David and Chenoa Rivera in Paradise, California. It was initially announced on September 19, 2017 to be a spin-off of the HGTV series Flip or Flop. After the original plan of a premiere in April 2018, the show's first regular season episode aired on August 16, 2018.

What differentiates Rustic Rehab from other flipping shows is that the buyers are looking for second homes or vacation rentals.

After the town was devastated by the Camp Fire in 2018, the series was pulled from the HGTV schedule. However, the Riveras have been actively involved in rebuilding the town, investing in the building of new fireproof housing.

Episodes

References

External links
Official website

2010s American reality television series
2018 American television series debuts
2018 American television series endings
HGTV original programming
Paradise, California
Television shows set in California